Winternoise Festival is a heavy metal festival held annually in Germany since 2006. It is organized by the BurningStage agency. The 2007 edition took place on 13 January at Eventcenter B 51 in Georgsmarienhütte.

Lineups

2006
Dissection
Rotten Sound
The Duskfall
The Vision Bleak
Totenmond
Sayyadina
Abrogation

2007
Moonspell
Endstille
Primordial
Communic
Sudden Death
Moonsorrow
A Life Divided

2008
Thyrgrim
Eisregen
Impaled Nazarene
Equilibrium
Necrophobic
Kampfar
Tyr
Manegarm
Svartsot
Impious

2009
Arkona
Mael Mordha
Thyrfing
Turisas
Moonsorrow

References

External links
Official website

Heavy metal festivals in Germany
Recurring events established in 2006
Culture of Lower Saxony